Carola Grey, born Carola Gschrey (born August 5, 1968, Munich) is a German jazz drummer and composer.

Grey studied piano as a child, but switched to drums as a teenager after hearing the recordings of Gene Krupa. She attended the Hochschule für Musik und Tanz Köln starting in 1989; In 1991-1992, she took a break from study to travel to New York City, where she worked with Craig Handy and Ron McClure on her debut recording as a leader. In 1994, she obtained a master's degree in jazz percussion performance from the Hochschule. She then returned to New York to study jazz at Parsons College; her second album as a leader was issued in 1994, which included Ravi Coltrane and Mike Stern as sidemen. In 1995 she moved back to Munich and issued a third album.

Discography
Noisy Mama (Jazzline, 1992)
The Age of Illusions (Jazzline, 1994)
Girls Can't Hit! (Lipstick, 1996)

References

Living people
1968 births
German jazz drummers
Hochschule für Musik und Tanz Köln alumni
Musicians from Munich